Twilight is a census-designated place (CDP) in Boone County, West Virginia, United States. As of the 2010 census, its population was 90. Twilight is approximately 20 miles from Madison. Twilight is accessible from Boone County Route 26, which is located right off West Virginia Route 85 at the Van Bridge split.

The name Twilight was chosen by the United States Postal Service in 1949 out of several names submitted. The ZIP code for Twilight is 25204.

References 

Census-designated places in Boone County, West Virginia
Census-designated places in West Virginia
Coal towns in West Virginia